Jeremy McArthur (born October 29, 1988), known professionally as Arthur McArthur, is a Grammy-nominated Canadian record producer from Toronto, Ontario. A classically trained piano and guitar player, he has been involved in music producing since 2008. He has worked with the artists Drake, Big Boi, Rick Ross, Tyga, Big Sean, Kelly Rowland, Dr. Dre, and Logic, among others.

Career 
McArthur grew up in Toronto, Ontario, Canada and received a formal training in piano. After leaving high school, he spent a year studying Western civilizations at university but dropped out and enrolled in the music program at Humber College instead. During his studies he collaborated with the local hip-hop producer Boi-1da, contributing to the song "Uptown" that featured on the So Far Gone EP by Drake. McArthur left education to pursue his interest in music, combining his classical training with an interest in hip-hop and rap. In Toronto he worked with JD Era, Son Real, and Rich Kidd.

In 2012 McArthur co-wrote and produced a number of interludes and the song "Kings & Queens" on Careless World: Rise Of The Last King by Tyga, while in the same year he contributed to the song "Rasberries" on Vicious Lies And Dangerous Rumors by Big Boi. He produced the comedy rap troupe The Lonely Island in 2013 and produced/co-wrote the song "This Is Love" on the Kelly Rowland album Talk a Good Game. The album charted in the top 10 of the Billboard 200. A year earlier, McArthur had also produced the Rick Ross track "Mind Games" that feature Rowland. In 2013 he also produced the track "Wide Open" for the B.o.B. album Underground Luxury, continuing the collaboration on the song "Confucious" featured on Psycadelik Thoughtz released in 2015.

McArthur worked with a number of acts contracted under the rapper and producer DJ Khaled, including Ace Hood. In 2013, he produced the song "Helen Keller" on Khaled's album Suffering from Success.

In 2014, he produced "The Sleaze" on Blacc Hollywood by Wiz Khalifa, which was nominated for a Grammy in 2015.

Mixtapes 
During his career McArthur also contributed to a number mixtapes, including Wrath of Caine (2013) by Pusha T, Good Nights & Bad Mornings 2 by Snow That Product, Welcome to Forever by Logic and Stranger Than Fiction by Kevin Gates.

Discography

References

1988 births
Living people
Place of birth missing (living people)
Canadian hip hop record producers
Musicians from Toronto